Gary McCracken (born May 19, 1951, in Sarnia, Ontario) is a Canadian musician. He was drummer for the band Max Webster from 1976  to 1981, when the band dissolved. As a member of Max Webster, McCracken played on six studio albums and co-writer and lead vocalist for the band's hit 1979 single, "A Million Vacations". He also collaborated on "Battle Scar" with Rush and drummer Neil Peart in 1980. McCracken has also played with bands including Triumph, Wrabit, Klaatu, and released a solo album, Audioscapes, in 2000.

In 2007, McCracken was named 32nd on Q107's Top 40 Classic Rock Drummers of All Time.

Since his time with Max Webster, McCracken has been teaching music in his hometown of Sarnia, Ontario.

References

1951 births
Canadian drummers
Living people
Canadian male drummers
Musicians from Ontario
People from Sarnia
Max Webster members